Brachodes rasata is a moth of the family Brachodidae. It is found in Tajikistan.

References

Moths described in 1900
Brachodidae